= List of NCAA Division I women's ice hockey seasons =

The following is a list of National Collegiate Athletic Association-sanctioned women's Division I ice hockey seasons:
